Aporosa latifolia is a species of plant in the family Phyllanthaceae. It is endemic to Sri Lanka.

References

latifolia
Endemic flora of Sri Lanka